John Edward Ames (born December 30, 1949) is an American writer of novels and short stories from Toledo, Ohio.  A critically acclaimed writer of western fiction, Ames began his career writing for pulp magazines before penning horror novels and stories.  In 1995, Ames' historical novel The Unwritten Order was a finalist for a Western Writers of America Spur Award.

Biography
Raised in Monroe County, Michigan, and educated at Eastern Michigan University, Ames lived in Colorado and New Mexico before settling in 1986 in New Orleans, Louisiana.
Before becoming a full-time writer, Ames taught English at Eastern Michigan University, the University of Northern Colorado and the University of New Mexico.  He enlisted in the Marine Corps in 1968 and served as a journalist, including seven months as a stringer in Japan for Stars and Stripes.

In 2004 Ames wrote The Real Deadwood, a mix of history and buff lore about Wild Bill Hickok and Calamity Jane.  Writing under the pseudonym Judd Cole, Ames wrote the entire twenty-three book Cheyenne series.  Under the same pen name he penned the eight-book Wild Bill series.

Ames fled with most fellow residents of New Orleans when Hurricane Katrina came ashore in 2005, but looming book deadlines forced him to return as soon as possible to his apartment on St. Charles Avenue, where he spent the next six months writing three novels. He contributed to Ellery Queen Mystery Magazine New Orleans Relief Issue.

He presently writes under a “house name” for one of the longest-published western series in America and has also written a novel, titled Deadwood Gulch, released in 2006, as Ralph Compton, the deceased "USA Today bestseller of frontier fiction" writer.

Works

Novels
The Force
Death Crystal
Spellcaster
The Asylum
The Unwritten Order
The Golden Circle
Soldier's Heart

The Cheyenne series (as Judd Cole)
Arrow Keeper
Death Chant
Renegade Justice
Vision Quest
Blood on the Plains
Comanche Raid
Comancheros
War Party
Pathfinder
Buffalo Hiders
Spirit Path
Mankiller
Wendigo Mountain
Death Camp
Renegade Nation
Orphan Train
Vengeance Quest
Warrior Fury
Bloody Bones Canyon
Renegade Siege
River of Death

The Wild Bill series (as Judd Cole)
1 Dead Man's Hand
2 The Kincaid County War
3 Bleeding Kansas
4 Yuma Bustout
5 Santa Fe Deathtrap
6 Black Hills Hellhole
7 Point Rider
8 Gun Law

Dan’l Boone: The Lost Wilderness Tales (last seven books as Dodge Tyler)
The Long Hunters
Warrior's Trace
The Kaintucks

Non-fiction
The Real Deadwood

Magazines
In addition to fifty-six book sales and six ghostwritten novels, Ames’ has written short stories and articles for magazines:

Alfred Hitchcock Mystery Magazine
Ellery Queen Mystery Magazine
The Writer
The Borderland Series
Mystery Scene
Colorado-North Review

References

External links
Author's website

Writers from Michigan
Eastern Michigan University alumni
Western (genre) writers
Living people
1949 births